Jo Maas (Eijsden, 6 October 1954) is a retired Dutch professional road bicycle racer. In the 1979 Tour de France, Maas won stage 10 and finished 7th place in the overall classification.

Major results

1978
Romsée-Stavelot-Romsée
Tour du Hainaut Occidental
1979
Tour de France:
Winner stage 10
7th place overall classification

External links 

Official Tour de France results for Jo Maas

1954 births
Living people
Dutch male cyclists
Dutch Tour de France stage winners
People from Eijsden-Margraten
Cyclists from Limburg (Netherlands)